The Trofeo Faip–Perrel is a professional tennis tournament played on indoor hard courts. It is currently part of the Association of Tennis Professionals (ATP) Challenger Tour. It is held annually at the PalaNorda di Bergamo - Palazzetto di Bergamo, in Bergamo, Italy, since 2006.

Past finals

Singles

Doubles

References

External links
Official website
ITF search

ATP Challenger Bergamo
ATP Challenger Bergamo
ATP Challenger Bergamo

Tennis tournaments in Italy